Trichomma is a genus of parasitoid wasps belonging to the family Ichneumonidae.

The genus has an almost cosmopolitan distribution.

Species 
 Trichomma albicoxum (Morley, 1913)
 Trichomma atrum (Dasch, 1984 
 Trichomma babai (Uchida, 1958) 
 Trichomma batistai (Gauld & Bradshaw, 1997) 
 Trichomma biroi (Szepligeti, 1906) 
 Trichomma cheesmanae (Gauld, 1978) 
 Trichomma clavipes (Krieger, 1904) 
 Trichomma cnaphalocrocis (Uchida, 1928) 
 Trichomma conjunctum (Wang, 1997) 
 Trichomma cornula (Wang, 1985) 
 Trichomma decorum (Cameron, 1897) 
 Trichomma dioryctri (Gauld, 1976) 
 Trichomma enecator (Rossi, 1790) 
 Trichomma fujianense (Wang, 1985) 
 Trichomma fulvidens (Wesmael, 1849) 
 Trichomma fumeum (Dasch, 1984) 
 Trichomma guilinense (Wang, 1985) 
 Trichomma insulare (Szepligeti, 1910) 
 Trichomma intermedium (Krieger, 1904) 
 Trichomma koreanum (Lee & Kim, 1983) 
 Trichomma lepidum (Wang, 1988) 
 Trichomma maceratum (Cresson, 1879) 
 Trichomma nigricans (Cameron, 1905) 
 Trichomma occisor (Habermehl, 1909) 
 Trichomma pacificum (Gauld, 1978) 
 Trichomma politum (Dasch, 1984) 
 Trichomma reticulatum (Davis, 1898) 
 Trichomma shennongicum (Wang, 1985) 
 Trichomma spatia (Wang, 1997) 
 Trichomma subnigricans (Wang, 1985)

References

Ichneumonidae
Ichneumonidae genera